The Nursing and Midwifery Board of Ireland (NMBI), formerly called , is the Regulator for the professions of nursing and midwifery in Ireland. It has a statutory obligation to protect the public and the integrity of the practice of the professions of nursing and midwifery. It performs its functions in the public interest under the Nurses Act, 1985 and the Nurses and Midwives Ac, 2011.

As the Regulator for the professions of nursing and midwifery, NMBI:

 maintains the Register of Nurses and Midwives and a Candidate Register for student nurses and midwives
 sets the standards for the education and training of nurses and midwives
 approves programmes of education necessary for registration and monitors these programmes on an ongoing basis 
 supports registrants by providing appropriate guidance on professional conduct and ethics for both registered nurses and midwives
 inquires into complaints about registrants and makes decisions relating to the imposition of sanctions on registered nurses and midwives who have findings made against them, and
 advises the Minister for Health and the public on all matters of relevance relating to its functions.

References

External links
Nursing and Midwifery Board of Ireland
Irish Health Service Executive

Nursing licensing organizations
Nursing in the Republic of Ireland
Medical and health organisations based in the Republic of Ireland